This is a list of the main career statistics of the Latvian professional tennis player Jeļena Ostapenko. She won the 2017 French Open.

Performance timelines

Only main-draw results in WTA Tour, Grand Slam tournaments, Fed Cup/Billie Jean King Cup and Olympic Games are included in win–loss records.

Singles
Current through the 2023 Dubai Open.

Doubles 
Current after the 2023 Dubai Open.

Mixed Doubles

Grand Slam finals

Singles: 1 (1 title)

Mixed doubles: 1 (1 runner–up)

Other significant finals

WTA 1000 finals

Singles: 2 (2 runner-ups)

Doubles: 4 (2 titles, 2 runner-ups)

WTA career finals

Singles: 13 (5 titles, 8 runner-ups)

Doubles: 13 (6 titles, 7 runner-ups)

Note: Tournaments sourced from official WTA archives

ITF Circuit finals

Singles: 10 (7 titles, 3 runner-ups)

Doubles: 9 (8 titles, 1 runner-up)

Note: Tournaments sourced from official ITF archives

Junior Grand Slam finals

Girls' singles: 1 (title)

Fed Cup/Billie Jean King Cup participation

Singles: 12 (7–5)

Doubles: 10 (6–4)

WTA Tour career earnings
Current after the 2022 Wimbledon.
{|cellpadding=3 cellspacing=0 border=1 style=border:#aaa;solid:1px;border-collapse:collapse;text-align:center;
|-style=background:#eee;font-weight:bold
|width="90"|Year
|width="100"|Grand Slam <br/ >titles|width="100"|WTA <br/ >titles
|width="100"|Total <br/ >titles
|width="120"|Earnings ($)
|width="100"|Money list rank
|-
|2014
|0
|0
|0
| align="right" |14,417
|389
|-
|2015
|0
|0
|0
| align="right" |214,080
|132
|-
|2016
|0
|0
|0
| align="right" |691,668
|46
|-
|2017
|1
|1
|2
| align="right" |3,998,026
| bgcolor="eee8aa" |6
|-
|2018
|0
|0
|0
| align="right" |2,602,164
|15
|-
|2019
|0
|1
|1
| align="right" |1,123,812
|38
|-
|2020
|0
|0
|0
| align="right" |415,805
|52
|-
|2021
|0
|1
|1
| align="right" |1,091,204
|29
|-
|2022
|0
|1
|1
|align=right|1,284,980
|16
|- style="font-weight:bold;"
|Career
|1
|4
|5
| align="right" |11,450,283
|48
|}

Career Grand Slam statistics

Seedings
The tournaments won by Ostapenko are in boldface, and advanced into finals by Ostapenko are in italics.

 Best Grand Slam tournament results details 
Grand Slam winners are in boldface', and runner–ups are in italics.Head-to-head records

Record against top 10 playersOstapenko's record against players who have been ranked in the top 10. Active players are in boldface.''

No. 1 wins

Top 10 wins

Notes

References

External links
 
 

Ostapenko, Jelena